The Asiatic Registration Act of 1906, of the Transvaal Colony, was an extension of the pass laws specifically aimed at Asians (Indians and Chinese).  Under the act every male Asian had to register himself and produce on demand a thumb-printed certificate of identity.  Unregistered people and prohibited immigrants could be deported without a right of appeal or fined on the spot if they failed to comply with act.

Under the act, every Asian man, woman or child of eight years or upwards, entitled to reside in the Transvaal, was required to register his or her name with the Registrar of Asiatics and take out a certificate of registration.  The applicants for registration had to surrender their old permits to the registrar, and state in their applications their name, residence, caste, age, etc.  The registrar was to note down important marks of identification upon the applicant's person, and take his finger and thumb impressions.

Parents were required to apply on behalf of their minor children and bring them to the registrar in order to give their finger impressions, etc. In case of parents failing to discharge this responsibility laid upon them, the minor on attaining the age of sixteen years was required to discharge it himself, and if he defaulted, he made himself liable to the same punishments as could be awarded to his parents.

Resistance to legislation
In response to the Transvaal Asiatic Registration Act, and to prevent the Asiatic community of South Africa suffering intolerable humiliation, Gandhi developed the concept of satyagraha.

In the book, Satyagraha in South Africa, Gandhi outlines how he developed the concept of satyagraha in South Africa.  In the following section, he provides a summary of the nature and content of the Transvaal Asiatic Registration Act, which he later renamed the "Black Act." The extract also provides a useful description by Gandhi of why the "Black Act" was resisted — on the grounds of the safety of the Indian community, and to prevent the Asiatic community of South Africa suffering an intolerable humiliation.

The Act was repealed by the British government shortly after enactment (after some lobbying by a delegation led by Mahatma Gandhi), but it was re-enacted again in 1908.

See also
 :Category:Apartheid laws in South Africa
 Apartheid in South Africa

References

 Gandhi, M. Satyagraha in South Africa, Navajivan Publishing House, Ahmedabad. Translated from the original Gujarati by Valji Govindji Desai

External links
 African History: Apartheid Legislation in South Africa

Apartheid laws in South Africa
1908 in South Africa
1908 in law